Vincenzo Di Palma (born 30 June 1970) is an Italian coxswain. He coxed the Italian men's eight at the 1996 Summer Olympics. He won a gold medal at the 2002 World Rowing Championships in Seville with the lightweight men's eight.

References

1970 births
Living people
Italian male rowers
World Rowing Championships medalists for Italy
Coxswains (rowing)
Rowers at the 1996 Summer Olympics
Olympic rowers of Italy